Poetics is the theory of structure, form, and discourse within literature, and, in particular, within poetry.

History
The term poetics derives from the Ancient Greek ποιητικός poietikos "pertaining to poetry"; also "creative" and "productive". In the Western world, the development and evolution of poetics featured three artistic movements concerned with poetical composition: (i) the formalist, (2) the objectivist, and (iii) the Aristotelian. (see the Poetics). Aristotle's Poetics is the first extant philosophical treatise to focus on literary theory.  The work was lost to the Western world for a long time. It was available in the Middle Ages and early Renaissance only through a Latin translation of an Arabic commentary written by Averroes and translated by Hermannus Alemannus in 1256. The accurate Greek-Latin translation made by William of Moerbeke in 1278 was virtually ignored. The Arabic translation departed widely in vocabulary from the original Poetics and it initiated a misinterpretation of Aristotelian thought that continued through the Middle Ages. Modern poetics developed in Renaissance Italy. The need to interpret ancient literary texts in the light of Christianity, to appraise and assess the narratives of Dante, Petrarch, and Boccaccio, contributed to the development of complex discourses on literary theory. Thanks first of all to Giovanni Boccaccio's Genealogia Deorum Gentilium (1360), the literate elite gained a rich understanding of metaphorical and figurative tropes. Giorgio Valla's 1498 Latin translation of Aristotle's text (the first to be published) was included with the 1508 Aldine printing of the Greek original as part of an anthology of Rhetores graeci. There followed an ever-expanding corpus of texts on poetics in the later fifteenth century and throughout the sixteenth, a phenomenon that began in Italy and spread to Spain, England, and France. Among the most important Renaissance works on poetics are Marco Girolamo Vida's De arte poetica (1527) and Gian Giorgio Trissino's La Poetica (1529, expanded edition 1563). By the early decades of the sixteenth century, vernacular versions of Aristotle's Poetics appeared, culminating in Lodovico Castelvetro's Italian editions of 1570 and 1576. Luis de Góngora (1561–1627) and Baltasar Gracián (1601–58) brought a different kind of sophistication to poetic. Emanuele Tesauro wrote extensively in his Il Cannocchiale Aristotelico (The Aristotelian Spyglass, 1654), on figure ingeniose and figure metaforiche. During the Romantic era, poetics tended toward expressionism and emphasized the perceiving subject. Twentieth-century poetics returned to the Aristotelian paradigm, followed by trends toward meta-criticality, and the establishment of a contemporary theory of poetics. Eastern poetics developed lyric poetry, rather than the representational mimetic poetry of the Western world.

In literary criticism
Poetics is distinguished from hermeneutics by its focus not on the meaning of a text, but rather its understanding of how a text's different elements come together and produce certain effects on the reader. Most literary criticism combines poetics and hermeneutics in a single analysis; however, one or the other may predominate given the text and the aims of the one doing the reading.

See also

List of basic poetry topics
Cognitive poetics
Descriptive poetics
Historical poetics
Figure of speech
Poetry analysis
Stylistic device
Rhetorical device
Meter (poetry)
Allegory
Allusion
Imagery
Musical form
Symbolist poetry
Sound poetry
Refrain
Literary theory
History of poetry
Poetics and Linguistics Association
Theopoetics

Notes and references

Further reading
Olson, Charles (1950). Projective Verse. New York, NY: Poetry New York.

 Original texts from 8 English poets before the 20th Century and from 8 20th Century Americans.

 

Aesthetics
Discourse analysis
Literature
Spoken word